Indolicidin is an antimicrobial peptide isolated from neutrophil blood cells of cows. The mature peptide is just 13 amino acids, making it one of the smallest antimicrobial peptides known to be encoded as the primary product of the encoding antimicrobial peptide gene. Indolicidin is active against bacterial pathogens, but has also been shown to kill fungi and even HIV virus.

References 

Peptides